Chuck Perkins (born Charles Perkins; August 25, 1965) is an American spoken word poet, orator, narrator, and activist who infuses the rhythms and vernacular from the Crescent City into his musical spoken word pieces. The New Orleans Times-Picayune says that he "recites poetry like a prize fighter...always going for a knock out." He has performed internationally at London's prestigious South Bank Centre with Amiri Baraka, as well as in Paris, Toulouse, Manchester, Liverpool, Cambridge, and Amsterdam.

Life
Son of Charles and Gail Perkins, Chuck was born in the inner city, Leonidas neighborhood in New Orleans, Louisiana. After high school he joined the U.S. Marines before living in Austin, Texas and Chicago, Illinois. Chuck finally settled back down in his home town in 2002.

Career

Spoken word albums
Bucket of Questions
A love song for NOLA

Spoken word collaborations
 The Voices of Urban Renewal in 2000 with Mos Def and Chuck D
 Nuspirits Helsinki (2002)

Film
 Tradition is a Temple Narration

Publications
 Spoken Word Revolution Redux (2007)
 Kente Cloth: South Western Voices of African Diaspora'' (1998)

External links
 Homepage
 Narration and Readings
 Narration
 
 {https://web.archive.org/web/20110707102436/http://www.akbanksanat.com/web/456-9254-1-1/akbank_art_archive/13rd_jazz_festival/performers/13rd_akbank_jazz_festival_nu_spirit_helsinki/ ]

References

American activists
Living people
1965 births
American male poets
21st-century American poets
21st-century American male writers